Road Rage is a 1999 American made-for-TV movie, a thriller starring Yasmine Bleeth and Jere Burns. It was first broadcast on NBC on October 3, 1999.

Plot
Ellen Carson (Yasmine Bleeth) is a real estate agent who inadvertently cuts off a delivery truck driver while changing lanes on the freeway to hurry home. The truck driver turns out to be a disturbed man named Eddie Madden (Jere Burns), who proceeds to chase after Ellen in an effort to run her off the road. Ellen in fear calls the 1-800 number on the back of his truck and lodges a complaint, which causes Eddie to lose his job, and he (being a grieving husband and father who earlier lost his family to a car accident) sets out to destroy Ellen's family and soon becomes fixated on Ellen and her teenage stepdaughter Cynthia (Alana Austin) and plots to have them as replacement family, by removing the head of the house, Ellen's husband and Cynthia's father Jim Carson (John Wesley Shipp).

Cast
Yasmine Bleeth as Ellen Carson
Jere Burns as Eddie Madden
Alana Austin as Cynthia Carson
John Wesley Shipp as Jim Carson
Michael Dobson as Bill, Cop #1
Jenica Bergere as Nina
Doug Abrahams as Steve Boyd
Nathaniel DeVeaux as Sergeant Ganz
Roger Barnes as Wilson
Robyn Driscoll	as Detective Jones
Donald Fong as Dry Cleaner
Viv Leacock as Ward
J.J. McColl as Tess
Maxine Miller as Mrs. Tate
Michelle Morgan as Rebecca
Linsea O'Shea as Donna
James Ralph as Cop #2
Pauline Roberts as Julie
J. Douglas Stewart as Mr. Breen

External links

1999 television films
1999 films
Trucker films
1999 thriller films
NBC network original films
Films directed by Deran Sarafian
Films scored by Joel McNeely
American thriller television films
1990s American films